Finlathen Aqueduct is an aqueduct in Dundee, Scotland. It is Category B listed.

History 
The aqueduct was constructed in the 1840s to carry water from Monikie Burn to Stobsmuir Reservoir. A second water main with a diameter of 15 inches was layed in 1862 however the expanded aqueduct proved inadequate. In the 1870s it was superseded by a new water supply from the Loch of Lintrathen. It was later opened as a footpath.

In July 2019, the aqueduct was closed and fenced off after sagging was observed. Part of the edge of the aqueduct subsequently collapsed overnight. The repaired bridge reopened in June 2022.

References 

Transport in Dundee
1840s establishments in Scotland
Aqueducts in Scotland
Category B listed buildings in Dundee